Archibald Buttars (November 21, 1838 – June 5, 1926) was an American politician who served in the Michigan Senate from 1881 to 1884 and as the 23rd lieutenant governor of Michigan from 1885 to 1887. he died in San Diego California at age 87

References

1838 births
1926 deaths
Republican Party Michigan state senators
Lieutenant Governors of Michigan
19th-century American politicians